This is a list of foreign players in the National Women's Soccer League. The following players:
Have played at least one NWSL regular season game. Players who were signed by NWSL clubs, but only played in playoff games, cup games, or did not play in any competitive games at all, are not included.
Are considered foreign, i.e., outside the United States determined by the following:
''A player is considered foreign if they are not eligible to play for the national team of the United States.
More specifically,
If a player has been capped on international level, the national team is used; if they have been capped by more than one country, the highest level (or the most recent) team is used. These include American players with dual citizenship.
If a player has not been capped on international level, their country of birth is used, except those who were born abroad from American parents, or moved to the United States at a young age, and those who clearly indicated to have switched his nationality to another nation.

Up to now, 40 different nations have been represented in the NWSL. Finland was the most recent nation to be represented when Natalia Kuikka made their debut playing for Portland Thorns FC.

Players listed in bold are currently signed to an NWSL roster.

Argentina 
Estefanía Banini – Washington Spirit (2015–2018)
Paulina Gramaglia – Houston Dash (2022–)
Mariana Larroquette – Kansas City Current (2021)

Australia 
Teigen Allen – Western New York Flash (2014)
Laura Alleway – Orlando Pride (2016–2017)
Ellie Brush – Houston Dash (2015–2016)
Ellie Carpenter – Portland Thorns FC (2018–2019)
Steph Catley – Portland Thorns FC (2014–2015), Orlando Pride (2016–2017), Reign FC (2018–2019)
Alex Chidiac – Racing Louisville FC (2022–)
Larissa Crummer – Seattle Reign FC (2017)
Chelsie Dawber – Chicago Red Stars (2022–)
Lisa De Vanna – Sky Blue FC (2013), Boston Breakers (2014), Washington Spirit (2014), Orlando Pride (2016)
Caitlin Foord – Sky Blue FC (2013–2015), Portland Thorns FC (2018–2019)
Katrina Gorry – FC Kansas City (2014), Utah Royals FC (2018)
Amy Harrison – Washington Spirit (2019)
Michelle Heyman – Western New York Flash (2015)
Elise Kellond-Knight – Reign FC (2019), Washington Spirit (2019)
Alanna Kennedy – Western New York Flash (2016), Orlando Pride (2017–2020)
Sam Kerr – Western New York Flash (2013–2014), Sky Blue FC (2015–2017), Chicago Red Stars (2018–2019)
Chloe Logarzo – Washington Spirit (2019), Kansas City Current (2021–)
Clare Polkinghorne – Portland Thorns FC (2015), Houston Dash (2018–2019)
Hayley Raso – Washington Spirit (2015), Portland Thorns FC (2016–2019)
Kyah Simon – Boston Breakers (2013, 2015–2016), Houston Dash (2018–2019)
Ashleigh Sykes – Portland Thorns FC (2017)
Emily van Egmond – Seattle Reign FC (2013), Chicago Red Stars (2014), Orlando Pride (2018–2021), San Diego Wave FC (2022–)
Lydia Williams – Western New York Flash (2014), Houston Dash (2016–2017), Reign FC (2017–2019)

Austria 
Nina Burger – Houston Dash (2014)

Belgium 
Janice Cayman – Western New York Flash (2016)

Bosnia and Herzegovina 
DiDi Haracic – Western New York Flash (2014), Washington Spirit (2016–2018), Sky Blue FC (2019–2021), Angel City FC (2022–)

Brazil 
Andressa – Houston Dash (2015–2017), Portland Thorns FC (2018–2019)
Angelina – OL Reign (2021–)
Bia – Boston Breakers (2015)
Bruna Benites – Houston Dash (2017)
Camilinha – Houston Dash (2015), Orlando Pride (2017–2019)
Debinha – North Carolina Courage (2017–)
Stefany Ferrer Van Ginkel – Angel City FC (2022–)
Ketlen – Boston Breakers (2015)
Leah Fortune – Orlando Pride (2016)
Gabi – Sky Blue FC (2019)
Marta – Orlando Pride (2017–)
Mônica – Orlando Pride (2016–2018)
Poliana – Houston Dash (2016–2017), Orlando Pride (2018)
Rafaelle – Houston Dash (2014)
Rafinha – Boston Breakers (2015)
Thais Reiss – Orlando Pride (2022–)
Rosana – North Carolina Courage (2017)
Thaisa – Sky Blue FC (2018)

Cameroon 
Michaela Abam – Sky Blue FC (2018), Houston Dash (2021–)
Estelle Johnson – Western New York Flash (2013), Washington Spirit (2015–2018), NJ/NY Gotham FC (2019–)
Ajara Nchout – Western New York Flash (2015)

Canada 
Lindsay Agnew* – Washington Spirit (2017), Houston Dash (2018–2019), North Carolina Courage (2020–)
Janine Beckie* – Houston Dash (2016–2017), Sky Blue FC (2018), Portland Thorns FC (2022–)
Josée Bélanger* – Orlando Pride (2016)
Melanie Booth* – Sky Blue FC (2013)
Allysha Chapman* – Houston Dash (2015–2016), Boston Breakers (2017), North Carolina Courage (2018), Houston Dash (2018–)
Candace Chapman – Washington Spirit (2013)
Sabrina D'Angelo* – Western New York Flash (2015–2016), North Carolina Courage (2017–2018)
Nkem Ezurike – Boston Breakers (2014–2015)
Jonelle Filigno* – Sky Blue FC (2014–2015)
Robyn Gayle* – Washington Spirit (2013–2014)
Vanessa Gilles – Angel City FC (2022–)
Jordyn Huitema* – OL Reign, (2022–)
Maegan Kelly – FC Kansas City (2017), Utah Royals FC (2018), Reign FC (2019), Houston Dash (2020–)
Kaylyn Kyle* – Seattle Reign FC (2013), Boston Breakers (2014), Houston Dash (2014), Portland Thorns FC (2015), Orlando Pride (2016)
Stephanie Labbé* –Washington Spirit (2016–2017), North Carolina Courage (2019–2020)
Karina LeBlanc* – Portland Thorns FC (2013), Chicago Red Stars (2014–2015)
Adriana Leon* – Boston Breakers (2013, 2017), Chicago Red Stars (2013–2015), Western New York Flash (2016), Sky Blue FC (2018), Seattle Reign FC (2018)
Jordyn Listro – Kansas City Current (2021), Orlando Pride (2022–)
Diana Matheson* – Washington Spirit (2013–2016), Seattle Reign FC (2017), Utah Royals FC (2018–2020)
Bryanna McCarthy* – Western New York Flash (2013)
Erin McLeod* – Chicago Red Stars (2013), Houston Dash (2014–2015), Orlando Pride (2020–)
Carmelina Moscato* – Chicago Red Stars (2013), Boston Breakers (2013), Seattle Reign FC (2014–2015)
Victoria Pickett – Kansas City Current (2021–)
Amandine Pierre-Louis* – Sky Blue FC (2018–2019)
Nichelle Prince* – Houston Dash (2017–)
Quinn* – Washington Spirit (2018), OL Reign (2019–)
Rachel Quon* – Chicago Red Stars (2013–2015)
Sarah Robbins – Portland Thorns FC (2015)
Jodi-Ann Robinson* – Western New York Flash (2013)
Sophie Schmidt* – Sky Blue FC (2013–2014), Houston Dash (2019–)
Desiree Scott* – FC Kansas City (2013, 2016–2017), Utah Royals FC (2018–2020), Kansas City Current (2021–)
Lauren Sesselmann* – FC Kansas City (2013), Houston Dash (2014–2015)
Kailen Sheridan* – Sky Blue FC (2017–2021), San Diego Wave FC (2022–)
Christine Sinclair* – Portland Thorns FC (2013–)
Chelsea Stewart* – Boston Breakers (2014), Western New York Flash (2015)
Bianca St. Georges* – Chicago Red Stars (2019–)
Melissa Tancredi* – Chicago Red Stars (2014–2015)
Evelyne Viens – Sky Blue FC (2020–)
Rhian Wilkinson* – Boston Breakers (2013), Portland Thorns FC (2015)
Shelina Zadorsky* – Washington Spirit (2016–2017), Orlando Pride (2018–2020)
Emily Zurrer* – Seattle Reign FC (2013)

Colombia 
Lady Andrade – Western New York Flash (2015–2016)

Costa Rica 
Shirley Cruz – OL Reign (2020–2021)
Raquel Rodríguez – Sky Blue FC (2016–2019), Portland Thorns FC (2020–)

Denmark 
Line Jensen – Washington Spirit (2016–2017)
Camilla Kur Larsen – Western New York Flash (2015)
Nadia Nadim – Sky Blue FC (2014–2015), Portland Thorns FC (2016–2017), Racing Louisville FC (2021–)
Theresa Nielsen – Reign FC (2018–2019)
Cecilie Sandvej – Washington Spirit (2014)
Katrine Veje – Seattle Reign FC (2015)

Dominican Republic 
Vanessa Kara – Racing Louisville FC (2021)
Brianne Reed – FC Kansas City (2016)

England 
Tinaya Alexander – Washington Spirit (2022–) 
Rachael Axon – Houston Dash (2015)
Ashley Baker – Sky Blue FC (2013)
Karen Bardsley – OL Reign (2021)
Gemma Bonner – Racing Louisville FC (2021–)
Rachel Daly – Houston Dash (2016–)
Natasha Dowie – Boston Breakers (2016–2017)
Leah Galton – Sky Blue FC (2016–2017)
Ebony Salmon – Racing Louisville FC (2021-2022), Houston Dash (2022–)
Lianne Sanderson – Boston Breakers (2013–2014), Portland Thorns FC (2015), Orlando Pride (2016), Western New York Flash (2016)
Jodie Taylor – Washington Spirit (2014), Portland Thorns FC (2015), OL Reign (2018–2020), Orlando Pride (2021), San Diego Wave FC (2022)
Miri Taylor – Angel City FC (2022–)
Carly Telford – San Diego Wave FC (2022–)
Amy Turner – Orlando Pride (2021–)
Chioma Ubogagu – Houston Dash (2016), Orlando Pride (2017–2019)

Equatorial Guinea 
Genoveva Añonman – Portland Thorns FC (2015)

Finland 
Natalia Kuikka – Portland Thorns FC (2021–)

France 
Sarah Bouhaddi – OL Reign (2021)
Daphne Corboz – Sky Blue FC (2017)
Aminata Diallo – Utah Royals (2020)
Amandine Henry – Portland Thorns FC (2016–2017)
Ghoutia Karchouni – Boston Breakers (2016)
Eugenie Le Sommer – OL Reign (2021)
Clarisse Le Bihan – Angel City FC (2022–)
Gaëtane Thiney – NJ/NY Gotham FC (2021)

Germany 
Nadine Angerer – Portland Thorns FC (2014–2015)
Eunice Beckmann – Boston Breakers (2016)
Sonja Fuss – Chicago Red Stars (2013)
Kerstin Garefrekes – Washington Spirit (2014)
Inka Grings – Chicago Red Stars (2013)
Dzsenifer Marozsan – OL Reign (2021)
Conny Pohlers – Washington Spirit (2013)
Marleen Schimmer – San Diego Wave FC (2022–)

Ghana 
Elizabeth Addo – Seattle Reign FC (2018)
Jennifer Cudjoe – NJ/NY Gotham FC (2020–)

Iceland 
Dagný Brynjarsdóttir – Portland Thorns FC (2016–2019)
Gunnhildur Jónsdóttir - Utah Royals FC (2018-2020), Orlando Pride (2021–)

Ireland 
Alli Murphy – Houston Dash (2018)
Denise O'Sullivan – Houston Dash (2016–2017), North Carolina Courage (2017–)
Stephanie Roche – Houston Dash (2015)

Israel 
Danielle Schulmann – Sky Blue FC (2016)

Jamaica 
Deneisha Blackwood – Houston Dash (2021)
Tiffany Cameron – Seattle Reign FC (2013), FC Kansas City (2013)
Cheyna Matthews – Washington Spirit (2016–2017, 2019), Racing Louisville FC (2021–)
Kayla McCoy – Houston Dash (2019–2020)
Satara Murray – Houston Dash (2019)
Konya Plummer – Orlando Pride (2020–2021)
Havana Solaun – Seattle Reign FC (2016), Washington Spirit (2017–2018), North Carolina Courage (2020–)

Japan 
Jun Endo – Angel City FC (2022–)
Yuri Kawamura – North Carolina Courage (2017–2018)
Nahomi Kawasumi – Seattle Reign FC (2014, 2016–2018), NJ/NY Gotham FC (2019–)
Nanase Kiryu – Sky Blue FC (2014)
Fuka Nagano – North Carolina Courage (2022–)
Yūki Nagasato – Chicago Red Stars (2017–2020), Racing Louisville (2021), Chicago Red Stars (2022–)
Hina Sugita – Portland Thorns FC (2022–)
Saori Takarada – Washington Spirit (2021)
Rumi Utsugi – Reign FC (2016–2019)
Kumi Yokoyama – Washington Spirit (2020–2021), NJ/NY Gotham FC (2022)

Mexico 
Jackie Acevedo* – Portland Thorns FC (2014)
Ariana Calderón – Houston Dash (2019)
Renae Cuéllar* – FC Kansas City (2013), Seattle Reign FC (2013), Washington Spirit (2014)
Maribel Domínguez* – Chicago Red Stars (2013)
Sabrina Flores – NJ/NY Gotham FC (2019–)
Dinora Garza* – Chicago Red Stars (2013)
Bianca Henninger – FC Kansas City (2013), Houston Dash (2014–2019)
Katie Johnson – Seattle Reign FC (2017), Sky Blue FC (2018), Chicago Red Stars (2019–2021), San Diego Wave FC (2022–)
Jimena López – OL Reign (2021–)
Teresa Noyola* – Seattle Reign FC (2013), FC Kansas City (2013), Houston Dash (2014)
Mónica Ocampo* – Sky Blue FC (2013–2015)
Diana Ordoñez – North Carolina Courage (2022–)
Verónica Pérez* – Western New York Flash (2013), Washington Spirit (2014)
Nayeli Rangel* – Sky Blue FC (2013)
Karina Rodríguez – Washington Spirit (2021–)
Ari Romero – Houston Dash (2014), Houston Dash (2019)
Jennifer Ruiz* – Seattle Reign FC (2013)
María Sánchez – Chicago Red Stars (2019), Houston Dash (2021–)
Cecilia Santiago* – Boston Breakers (2013)
Bianca Sierra – Washington Spirit (2014), Boston Breakers (2014)
Pamela Tajonar* – Western New York Flash (2013)
Guadalupe Worbis* – Washington Spirit (2013)

Netherlands 
Manon Melis – Seattle Reign FC (2016)
Maruschka Waldus – Sky Blue FC (2015)

New Zealand 
Katie Bowen – FC Kansas City (2016–2017), Utah Royals FC (2018–2020), Kansas City Current (2021), North Carolina Courage (2022–)
Abby Erceg – Chicago Red Stars (2014–2015), Western New York Flash (2016), North Carolina Courage (2017–)
Emma Kete – Western New York Flash (2014)
Ali Riley – Orlando Pride (2020–2021), Angel City FC (2022–)
Rebekah Stott – Seattle Reign FC (2017), Sky Blue FC (2018)
Rosie White – Boston Breakers (2017), Chicago Red Stars (2018), OL Reign (2019–)

Nigeria 
Michelle Alozie – Houston Dash (2021–)
Halimatu Ayinde – Western New York Flash (2015–2016)
Josephine Chukwunonye – Washington Spirit (2015)
Osinachi Ohale – Houston Dash (2014)
Ngozi Okobi – Washington Spirit (2015)
Ifeoma Onumonu – Boston Breakers (2017), Portland Thorns (2018), Reign FC (2019), NJ/NY Gotham FC (2020–)
Francisca Ordega – Washington Spirit (2015–2018)

Northern Ireland 
Rebecca Holloway – Racing Louisville FC(2022–)

Norway 
Emilie Haavi – Boston Breakers (2017)
Nora Holstad Berge – North Carolina Courage (2017)
Elise Thorsnes – Utah Royals FC (2018)
Lisa-Marie Woods – Boston Breakers (2013)

Poland 
Nikki Krzysik – FC Kansas City (2014)

Puerto Rico 
Jill Aguilera – Chicago Red Stars (2022–)
Nickolette Driesse – Orlando Pride (2017), Sky Blue FC (2018)

Portugal 
Amanda DaCosta – Washington Spirit (2015), Chicago Red Stars (2016), Boston Breakers (2017)
Suzane Pires – Boston Breakers (2015)
Jéssica Silva – Kansas City Current (2021)

Samoa 
Mariah Bullock – Boston Breakers (2013), Seattle Reign FC (2014–2015)

Scotland 
Rachel Corsie – Seattle Reign FC (2015–2017), Utah Royals FC (2018–2020), Kansas City Current (2021)
Claire Emslie – Orlando Pride (2019–2020), Angel City FC (2022–)
Kim Little – Seattle Reign FC (2014–2016, 2022)

South Africa 
Thembi Kgatlana – Houston Dash (2018)
Linda Motlhalo – Houston Dash (2018)
Janine van Wyk – Houston Dash (2017–2018)

South Korea 
Jeon Ga-eul – Western New York Flash (2016)
Lee So-dam – NJ/NY Gotham FC (2021–)

Spain 
Sonia Bermúdez – Western New York Flash (2014)
Verónica Boquete – Portland Thorns FC (2014), Utah Royals FC (2019–2020)
Laura del Río – Washington Spirit (2015)
Celia Jiménez – OL Reign (2019–2021)
Vicky Losada – Western New York Flash (2014)
Adriana Martín – Western New York Flash (2013–2014)

Sweden 
Sofia Jakobsson – San Diego Wave FC (2022–) 
Freja Olofsson – Racing Louisville FC (2021–)
Julia Roddar – Washington Spirit (2021–)
Louise Schillgard – Boston Breakers (2016)
Julia Spetsmark – North Carolina Courage (2019)
Hanna Terry – Portland Thorns FC (2014–2015)

Switzerland 
Ana-Maria Crnogorčević – Portland Thorns FC (2018–2019)

Trinidad and Tobago 
Kennya Cordner – Seattle Reign FC (2013)

Wales 
Jess Fishlock – OL Reign (2013–)
Angharad James – North Carolina Courage (2021), Orlando Pride (2022–)

Notes
An asterisk (*) indicates the player's NWSL salary is/was paid for by her nation's federation.

Bold indicates current player and their team.

References

External links
 National Women's Soccer League: Players

United States
 
Players foreign
NWSL, foreign
Association football player non-biographical articles